Leithfield is a small town in north Canterbury, New Zealand. The Leithfield area consists of two semi-distinct areas, Leithfield Beach to the east of State Highway 1 and Leithfield Village adjacent to and immediately to the west of State Highway 1. Leithfield sits just south of the South Branch of the Kowai River.

Leithfield's regional importance is behind that of Amberley with its wine industry and the tourist center of Hanmer Springs. This is due in large part to its proximity to the district centre at Amberley. Despite this proximity, the Leithfield community supports a school, library, summer swimming pool, and many small businesses.

History 
Leithfield was founded in 1857 by John Leith. He purchased a windmill in 1862 and brought it from Christchurch to Leithfield in order to mill wheat. The mill building was 23 meters tall and each sail was 12 meters long making it the tallest building in Canterbury at the time. Unfortunately the Canterbury nor'westerly winds damaged the mill building making it inoperable. In 1880, Leithfield was a town of 700 people. It had three churches, a police station, a court, a school, three hotels and five shops.

Demographics
Leithfield and Leithfield Beach are both defined by Statistics New Zealand as rural settlements and cover  and  respectively. They are included in Balcairn statistical area.

Leithfield and Leithfield Beach combined had a population of 981 at the 2018 New Zealand census, an increase of 27 people (2.8%) since the 2013 census, and an increase of 216 people (28.2%) since the 2006 census. There were 396 households. There were 462 males and 510 females, giving a sex ratio of 0.91 males per female, with 168 people (17.1%) aged under 15 years, 132 (13.5%) aged 15 to 29, 486 (49.5%) aged 30 to 64, and 195 (19.9%) aged 65 or older.

Ethnicities were 94.5% European/Pākehā, 11.0% Māori, 1.8% Pacific peoples, 0.9% Asian, and 1.5% other ethnicities (totals add to more than 100% since people could identify with multiple ethnicities).

Although some people objected to giving their religion, 58.4% had no religion, 30.6% were Christian, 0.3% were Hindu, 0.3% were Buddhist and 1.5% had other religions.

Of those at least 15 years old, 69 (8.5%) people had a bachelor or higher degree, and 189 (23.2%) people had no formal qualifications. The employment status of those at least 15 was that 408 (50.2%) people were employed full-time, 117 (14.4%) were part-time, and 18 (2.2%) were unemployed.

Balcairn statistical area

Balcairn had a population of 2,343 at the 2018 New Zealand census, an increase of 153 people (7.0%) since the 2013 census, and an increase of 471 people (25.2%) since the 2006 census. There were 921 households. There were 1,161 males and 1,182 females, giving a sex ratio of 0.98 males per female. The median age was 47 years (compared with 37.4 years nationally), with 417 people (17.8%) aged under 15 years, 315 (13.4%) aged 15 to 29, 1,134 (48.4%) aged 30 to 64, and 477 (20.4%) aged 65 or older.

Ethnicities were 95.5% European/Pākehā, 7.8% Māori, 1.3% Pacific peoples, 1.3% Asian, and 1.8% other ethnicities (totals add to more than 100% since people could identify with multiple ethnicities).

The proportion of people born overseas was 15.1%, compared with 27.1% nationally.

Although some people objected to giving their religion, 54.2% had no religion, 34.8% were Christian, 0.3% were Hindu, 0.3% were Buddhist and 2.0% had other religions.

Of those at least 15 years old, 267 (13.9%) people had a bachelor or higher degree, and 417 (21.7%) people had no formal qualifications. The median income was $31,100, compared with $31,800 nationally. The employment status of those at least 15 was that 987 (51.2%) people were employed full-time, 336 (17.4%) were part-time, and 39 (2.0%) were unemployed.

Education

Notes

Populated places in Canterbury, New Zealand
Hurunui District